South Conference, Southern Conference, Conference South, or variant, may refer to:

 National League South (formerly Conference South), National League, England, UK; a tier 1 pro soccer league division below elite league
 Big South Conference, Division I, NCAA, USA; a collegiate sports conference
 Southern Conference, Division I, NCAA, USA; a collegiate sports conference
 Conference League South, UK; a tier 4 division of rugby league football

See also
 
 
 South Central Conference (disambiguation)
 Southern Division (disambiguation)
 Conference
 Southern (disambiguation)
 South (disambiguation)